The 1976 Torneo Godó or Trofeo Conde de Godó was a men's tennis tournament that took place on outdoor clay courts at the Real Club de Tenis Barcelona in Barcelona in Spain. It was the 24th edition of the Torneo Godó tournament and was part of the Three Star category of the 1976 Grand Prix circuit. It was held from 18 October through 24 October 1976. Fourth-seeded Manuel Orantes won the singles title.

Finals

Singles
 Manuel Orantes defeated  Eddie Dibbs 6–1, 2–6, 2–6, 7–5, 6–4
 It was Orantes' 6th singles title of the year and the 28th of his career.

Doubles
 Brian Gottfried /  Raúl Ramírez defeated  Bob Hewitt /  Frew McMillan 7–6, 6–4

References

External links
 ITF tournament edition details
 ATP tournament profile
 Official tournament website

Barcelona Open (tennis)
Torneo Godo
Torneo Godo
Torneo Godo